Soyombiin Barsuud is a football club from Ulaanbaatar, Mongolia. They currently play in the Mongolia National Premier League, the highest level of football in Mongolia, making their debut appearance in the 2015 season. They have no professional footballers.

References

Football clubs in Mongolia
Association football clubs established in 2009
2009 establishments in Mongolia